The Pittsburgh Triangles were a charter franchise of World Team Tennis (WTT). The Triangles won the 1975 WTT Championship. The team folded after the 1976 season.

Team history
The Triangles were founded in 1973 as a charter member of WTT by Century Features, Inc. owner Charles "Chuck" Reichblum (later popularly known as "Dr. Knowledge"), industrialist John H. Hillman III, and lawyer William "Bill" Sutton. In 1972, the three  Pittsburgh executives had previously founded the similar National Tennis League (NTL), a forerunner to WTT and Reichblum's brainchild, which was made redundant by the advent of WTT (founding members of which had been invited to join the NTL prior to formation of the competing WTT in 1973).

The team began play in WTT's inaugural 1974 season. Just prior to the start of the Triangles' initial season, on May 1, 1974, Fox Chapel insurance broker, sports promoter, and financier Frank B. Fuhrer purchased a controlling interest in the team. Fuhrer was elected the team's chairman. Reichblum remained president and general manager. Sutton remained part of the ownership group and was re-elected as the team's secretary-treasurer and general counsel.

The Triangles played their home matches at the Civic Arena in Pittsburgh, Pennsylvania. During their first season, the Triangles, clad in bright yellow and green uniforms, played in the WTT Eastern Division with teams from Philadelphia, Boston, New York, Baltimore, Detroit, Cleveland, and Toronto-Buffalo. WTT also had an eight-team Western Division for a total of 16 teams representing most of the major metropolitan areas in the United States. There was even a team from Hawaii called the Leis.

The Triangles folded following the 1976 season. With Pittsburgh and Philadelphia both lacking franchises, the league had considered fielding a team called the Pennsylvania Keystones in 1977, composed of players from the Soviet Union. However, with the Cleveland Nets struggling to draw fans for their home matches, owner Joseph Zingale decided to fill the WTT void in nearby Pittsburgh and have his team play approximately half of its home matches in Richfield Township, Summit County, Ohio and the other half in Pittsburgh. The team was called the Cleveland-Pittsburgh Nets. After the Nets announced they would play half their matches in Pittsburgh, the league had planned to have the Keystones play in Philadelphia. The team of Soviet players did compete in WTT in 1977, but it did not have a permanent home and played its "home" matches in several different cities. The name Pennsylvania Keystones was scrapped, and the team was officially called the Soviet National Team and informally the Soviets.

As for the Nets, they played approximately half their 1977 home matches at the Coliseum at Richfield and the other half at the Civic Arena in Pittsburgh. The Nets also played some "home" matches in Nashville, New Orleans and Hollywood, Florida.

Coaching
The Australian tennis star Ken Rosewall coached the original Pittsburgh Triangles team in 1974. Rosewall's top players were Evonne Goolagong, who had already captured her first Wimbledon singles title in 1971, and young phenom Vitas Gerulaitis. Vitas, nicknamed the Lithuanian Lion, had recently won the West Penn Open in Mt. Lebanon and would go on to win the 1975 Wimbledon men's doubles crown (with Sandy Mayer) and the 1977 Australian Open men's singles title.

Players

Squad 1974
Evonne Goolagong was not allowed to participate in the 1974 French Open due to her association with WTT and the Triangles.
 Ken Rosewall, head coach
 Vitas Gerulaitis
 Evonne Goolagong
 Peggy Michel
 Harold Solomon
 Laura duPont
 Mona Schallau
 Jeff Borowiak
 Kathy Blake
 Patrick DuPre
 Jane Stratton
 Tom Edlefsen
 Gerald Battrick
Linda Lewis
Jill Cooper
 Brian Teacher
Isabel Fernández
 Anand Amritraj
  Paul Osbourn  headball boy

 Paolo Bertolucci
Mary O'Keef
Bob Chappell

Squad 1975
Two days after winning the WTT championship Fuhrer traded Kim Warwick and Rayni Fox to the Cleveland Nets for Sue Stap.
 Vic Edwards, Head Coach
 Mark Cox
 Rayni Fox
 Vitas Gerulaitis
 Evonne Goolagong-Cawley
 Peggy Michel
 Kim Warwick

Squad 1976
With Goolagong-Cawley signed for the 1976 season, Mark Cox was elevated to the Triangles' player-coach. The Triangles also recruited college star JoAnne Russell and Bernard Mitton. Midway through the 1976 season the recently acquired Sue Stap was traded for Nancy Gunter.

 Mark Cox
 Dan McGibben, Head Coach (2nd half)
 Vitas Gerulaitis
 Evonne Goolagong-Cawley
 Nancy Gunter (mid-season)
 Bernard Mitton – 1976 Davis Cup
 JoAnne Russell
 Sue Stap

Results
1974: 30-14 Second in Central Section of Eastern Division—defeated Detroit 63-27 First Round—lost to Philadelphia 52-45 Eastern Division Final
1975: 36-8 First in Eastern Division—Bye in First Round—defeated Boston 2 games to 0 Eastern Division Final—defeated Golden Gaters (San Francisco) 2 games to 1 for WTT Championship
1976: 24-20 Second in Eastern Division—lost to New York 2 games to 1 Eastern Division Final
1977: Become Pennsylvania Keystones during off-season, intending to play home games in both Pittsburgh and Philadelphia; fold before season begins primarily due to financial reasons.

References

External links
 World TeamTennis, official website
 Love Triangles: Pittsburgh Adored its World Team Tennis Franchise by Rick Shrum (Post Gazette) 
 Profile - Danny McGibbeny
 Extinct Sports Leagues by Steve Dimitry

Triangles
Defunct World TeamTennis teams
Sports teams in Pennsylvania
Tennis in Pennsylvania
1973 establishments in Pennsylvania
1976 disestablishments in Pennsylvania
Sports clubs established in 1973
Sports clubs disestablished in 1976